Ron Kingston (10 October 1931 – 15 March 1997) was an Australian rules footballer, who played in the Victorian Football League (VFL). He was a member of what the historian Manning Clark called “that great half-back line of Lucas, Kingston and Tuck”. His spring and high-marking ability allowed him to hold the key position of centre-half-back, even though he was 4 cm shorter than either of his flankers, Lucas, and Tuck.

References

External links

Australian rules footballers from Victoria (Australia)
Collingwood Football Club players
Collingwood Football Club Premiership players
Cooee Football Club players
1931 births
1997 deaths
One-time VFL/AFL Premiership players